Scottish Rite Cathedral and Scottish Rite Temple are names commonly applied to buildings used by  Ancient and Accepted Scottish Rite, a body associated with Freemasonry. It may refer to any of a number of specific buildings, including:

in the United States
(by state then town or city)
The Temple Downtown, listed on the National Register of Historic Places (NRHP) as Scottish Rite Temple, in Mobile County, Alabama
Scottish Rite Cathedral (Tucson, Arizona), listed on the NRHP in Pima County, Arizona
 Scottish Rite Cathedral (Long Beach, California), Long Beach Historic Landmark
 Scottish Rite Cathedral (Pasadena, California), deemed NRHP-eligible but not listed
 Scottish Rite Masonic Center (San Francisco, California)
 Scottish Rite Masonic Temple (Los Angeles), California
 Scottish Rite Cathedral (Moline, Illinois)
 Scottish Rite Cathedral (Peoria, Illinois)
 Scottish Rite Cathedral (Indianapolis, Indiana), listed on the NRHP in Marion County, Indiana
 Scottish Rite Consistory Building, Des Moines, Iowa, listed on the NRHP in Polk County, Iowa
 Scottish Rite Temple (Kansas City, Kansas), listed on the NRHP in Wyandotte County, Kansas
 Scottish Rite Temple (Wichita, Kansas), listed on the NRHP in Sedgwick County, Kansas
 Ancient and Accepted Scottish Rite Temple, Louisville, KY, listed on the NRHP in Jefferson County, Kentucky
 Scottish Rite Cathedral (Shreveport, Louisiana), listed on the NRHP in Caddo Parish, Louisiana
 Scottish Rite Temple (Minneapolis, Minnesota)
 Scottish Rite Cathedral (Joplin, Missouri), listed on the NRHP in Jasper County, Missouri
 Scottish Rite Temple (Lincoln, Nebraska), listed on the NRHP in Lancaster County, Nebraska
 Scottish Rite Cathedral (Omaha, Nebraska), now known as the Omaha Scottish Rite Masonic Center, listed on the NRHP in Douglas County, Nebraska
 Scottish Rite Cathedral (Santa Fe, New Mexico), listed on the NRHP in Santa Fe County, New Mexico
 Scottish Rite Temple (Guthrie, Oklahoma), listed on the NRHP in Logan County, Oklahoma
 McAlester Scottish Rite Temple (McAlester, Oklahoma), listed on the NRHP in Pittsburg County, Oklahoma
 Scottish Rite Cathedral (Harrisburg, Pennsylvania)
 Scottish Rite Cathedral (New Castle, Pennsylvania), listed on the NRHP in Lawrence County, Pennsylvania
 Masonic Temple and Scottish Rite Cathedral, Scranton, PA, now known as the Scranton Cultural Center and listed on the NRHP in Lackawanna County, Pennsylvania
 Dallas Scottish Rite Temple (Dallas, Texas), listed on the NRHP in Dallas County, Texas
 Scottish Rite Cathedral (Galveston, Texas), listed on the NRHP in Galveston County, Texas
 Scottish Rite Cathedral (San Antonio, Texas), listed on the NRHP in Bexar County, Texas

See also
Scottish Rite Dormitory, Austin, Texas, listed on the NRHP in Texas
Scottish Rite Hospital for Crippled Children, Decatur, Georgia, listed on the NRHP in Georgia
Texas Scottish Rite Hospital for Children, Dallas, Texas
House of the Temple in Washington, D.C.